One Day is the debut single album by South Korean rapper One. It was released on July 11, 2017, by YG Entertainment and distributed by Genie Music. It was One's only musical release under YG before his departure on July 7, 2019.

The single album peaked at number 6 on the Gaon Album Chart.

Release 
The single album was digitally released on July 11, 2017, through several music portals, including MelOn in South Korea, and on iTunes worldwide. It was physically released on July 18.

Commercial performance 
One Day debuted at number 10 on the Gaon Album Chart, on the chart issue dated July 9-15, 2017. In its second week, the single album fell to number 11 and peaked at number 6 in its third week. The single album placed at number 14 on the Gaon Album Chart for the month of July 2017, with 8,551 physical copies sold.

The song "Gettin' By" debuted at number 59 on the Gaon Digital Chart, on the chart issue dated July 9-15, 2017, with 34,949 downloads sold. The song "Heyahe" debuted at number 78 on the componing Download Chart with 20,880 downloads sold in the same week.

Track listing 
Credits adapted from Genie.

Charts

Weekly chart

Monthly chart

Release history

References 

2017 debut singles
YG Entertainment singles